Shirbim (also Romanized as Shīrbīm and Shīr-i-Bīm) is a village in Bakesh-e Yek Rural District, in the Central District of Mamasani County, Fars Province, Iran. At the 2006 census, its population was 262, in 66 families.

References 

Populated places in Mamasani County